The following is a complete list of episodes for the television show sitcom The Drew Carey Show, which first aired on ABC on September 13, 1995. Throughout the show's run, nine seasons were filmed amassing 233 episodes, with the final episode airing on September 8, 2004. The sitcom follows assistant personnel director Drew Carey, in his romances and relationships to friends Lewis, Oswald, and Kate. There have been two DVD releases for The Drew Carey Show: the first was a six-episode compilation released on February 28, 2006 and the first season was released on April 24, 2007.

Series overview

Episodes

Season 1 (1995–96)
This season introduces Drew Carey as Assistant Director of Personnel at Winfred-Louder. His unseen but often heard boss is Mr. Bell (Kevin Pollak), who has an obnoxious assistant, Mimi Bobeck (Kathy Kinney), who often clashes with Drew. Drew spends much of his free time with friends Lewis (Ryan Stiles), Oswald (Diedrich Bader) and Kate (Christa Miller) and their favorite hangout is a tavern called 'Warsaw'. Throughout the season Drew has an on again-off again girlfriend, Lisa Robbins (Katy Selverstone) while Jay Clemens (Robert Torti) is Kate's boyfriend for the later half of Season 1.

The theme music for the first season's opening credits consists of Drew Carey singing "Moon Over Parma".

Season 2 (1996–97)
This season starts with Winfred-Louder in turmoil and Mr. Bell fired. The first few episodes see both Kate and Drew become single again, with Drew breaking up with Lisa Robbins (Katy Selverstone) and Jay Clemens (Robert Torti) breaking up with Kate before leaving for Minnesota. 

The show's theme slowly changed from "Moon Over Parma" which was gradually phased out in favour of "Five O'Clock World" by The Vogues.

Season 3 (1997–98)
The main story arc of this season is Kate and Oswald's relationship, which starts with them getting together in secret early on in the season, before they start going out leading up to the wedding at the end of the season. For much of the season, realtor Nicki Fifer (Kate Walsh) is Drew's girlfriend, and as the season progress, the more bad habits she picks up from Drew. Drew's brother, Steve Carey (John Carroll Lynch) is introduced, and revealed to be a cross dresser. Nan Martin has a recurring role as Winfred-Louder owner, Mrs. Fran Louder who is having an affair with Larry Almada (Ian Gomez).

The theme song for the first two episodes is "Five O'Clock World", with "Cleveland Rocks" replacing it from the third episode "Strange Bedfellows".

This season also introduces the "What's Wrong with This Episode?" series, in which viewers are asked to track down the mistakes made during the course of the episode, which airs on the same week as April Fool's Day.

Season 4 (1998–99)
The season starts with Kate and Oswald back to being friends. After Drew uncovers a conspiracy in the opening episode, there is a 4 episode story arc where Drew starts up the Horn Dogs again and gains Darcy, a groupie girlfriend, and loses interest in Winfred-Louder. At the same time as his band gets an offer to be a permanent house band, Mr. Wick has to stand down for a while as Store Manager and goes into rehab for treatment with cocaine. Drew dates several different women early on (Darcy, Celia), but for the later part of the season he is seeing Sharon Bridges (Jenica Bergere). Mimi starts dating Drew's brother Steve, much to Drew's disgust. Nan Martin has a recurring role as Mrs. Louder.

Season 5 (1999–2000)
This season sees Steve Carey and Mimi get engaged and later married and Drew and Kate fall in love.

Season 6 (2000–01)
For the first part of the season, Drew is engaged to Kate, but after they break up he has a sham marriage with Wick, while Steve and Mimi have a baby together.

The fourth and final installment of "What's Wrong with This Episode?" also airs in this season; beginning in 2009, it has become a recurring theme on April Fool's episodes of the real Drew Carey's game show, The Price Is Right (which he first started hosting in October 2007).

Season 7 (2001–02)

Season 8 (2002–03)
In the fall of 2002, Winfred-Louder closed and the set became the office of online retailer Neverending Store. Drew, Mimi, and Nigel were hired (the latter as a janitor, but was written out of the series). Steve Carey was phased out as well. Kate O'Brien leaves the series after the 2nd episode as she is marrying a fighter pilot and was quickly replaced with Kellie Newmark (Cynthia Watros), an old high school friend of Drew's who had been working as a stripper.

Season 9 (2004)
The last season was mainly focused on Kellie's evolving relationship with Drew from friend to girlfriend to being pregnant with his child. Mr. Wick makes a return for the last two episodes. Season 9 did not air in production order.  The following list represents the order in which they were originally broadcast rather than the correct production order.

Based on production code and story line, the correct order for season 9 is most likely the following:

Notelist

References

External links

 

Lists of American sitcom episodes